The Critics' Choice Movie Award for Best Comedy is one of the awards given to people working in the motion picture industry by the Broadcast Film Critics Association.

List of winners and nominees

2000s

2010s

2020s

Multiple wins
David O. Russell – 2

Multiple nominations
Judd Apatow – 5
David O. Russell – 3
Paul Feig – 3
Adam McKay - 3
Nicholas Stoller – 3
Jason Reitman – 2
Glenn Ficarra and John Requa – 2
Phil Lord and Christopher Miller – 2
Joel Coen and Ethan Coen – 2
Woody Allen – 2
Shane Black – 2
Rian Johnson – 2
Shawn Levy - 2
Wes Anderson - 2

References

F
Lists of films by award
Awards for best film